Boerhavia gracillima, the slimstalk spiderling, is a plant species native to Arizona, New Mexico, Texas and Mexico. It prefers dry, rocky areas such as grasslands, desert scrub, roadsides and pinyon-juniper woodlands.

Boerhavia gracillima is a perennial herb, often woody at the base. Stems are trailing to erect, with many branches. Leaves are mostly on the lower half of the plant, getting smaller further up. Flowers are red, clustered in the axils of the leaves or at the tips of the stems, each flower up to 4.5 mm (0.2 inches) long.

References

gracillima
Flora of Arizona
Flora of Texas
Flora of Mexico
Flora of New Mexico